Gedaliah ibn Yahya ben Joseph (Hebrew: גדליה אבן יחיא בן יוסף;  – 1587) was a 16th-century Italian Talmudist and Biblical chronologist chiefly known for his Biblical Chronology  "Shalshelet HaḲabbalah".

Biography 
Born in Imola, Italy, the son of Joseph ibn Yahya ben Solomon and Abigail. In his early years he studied in Ferrara under Abraham Rovigo, later settling down in Rovigo, where he remained until 1562 when the burning of the Talmud took place in Italy. Following this he briefly lived in Salonica, moving back to Imola in 1567. He was later expelled with other Jews by Pope Pius V, and suffering a loss of 10,000 gold pieces, he went to Pesaro, and thence to Ferrara, where he remained till 1575. During the ensuing eight years he led a wandering life, and finally settled in Alexandria, which perhaps is where he died in 1587. Another theory "...indicates that Gedaliah did not die in Alexandria, Egypt, but in Alessandria, a town sixty to seventy miles northwest of Genoa, Italy, along the road to Turin."

Ibn Yayha's chief work was the Sefer Shalshelet ha-Ḳabbalah, called also Sefer Yaḥya, on which he labored for more than forty years. This work is not without defects, having suffered either by reason of the author's itinerant mode of life or through faulty copying of the original manuscript. Its contents are as follows:
 History and genealogy of the Jews from the time of Moses until that of Moses Norzi (1587)
 Account of the heavenly bodies, Creation, the soul, magic, and evil spirits
 History of the peoples among which the Jews have dwelt, and a description of the unhappy fate of the author's coreligionists up to his time.
The Shalshelet ha-Ḳabbalah was published at Venice, 1587; Cracow, 1596; Amsterdam, 1697; Zolkiev, 1802, 1804; Polonnoye, 1814; and Lemberg, 1862.

Gedaliah was the alleged author of twenty-one other works, which he enumerates at the end of his Shalshelet and which are mentioned also in Benjacob's Oẓar ha-Sefarim.

References

Maria L. Mayer Modena, La Masseket Hamor di Gedalyà ibn Yahia, “Italia”, In Memory of Giuseppe Sermoneta, XIII-XV (2001), pp. 303–342
 In praise of women – the article of Rabbi Gedaliah Ibn Yahya (1526-1587)

1510s births
1580s deaths
Jewish historians
16th-century Italian historians
Italian Sephardi Jews
Egyptian rabbis
16th-century rabbis from the Ottoman Empire
16th-century Italian rabbis